Jacques Marquette is a public art work by artist Ronald Knepper. It is located on the campus of Marquette University west of downtown Milwaukee, Wisconsin.

Description
Jacques Marquette depicts a bearded, long-haired Marquette dressed in a belted robe. His long cassock cloak trails behind him. In one hand, he holds a map. A crucifix is visible at his belt. The base of the sculpture looks like a jagged rock.

Location
The sculpture is installed in the central interior area of the campus, just east of the St. Joan of Arc Chapel.

Commissioning process
Knepper was commissioned to create the work in May 2004. Funding for the commission was donated by John Madden, an alumnus and member of Marquette's board of trustees, and his wife Mary.  Curtis L. Carter, then director of the campus Patrick and Beatrice Haggerty Museum of Art, managed the commission.

References

Outdoor sculptures in Milwaukee
2005 sculptures
Bronze sculptures in Wisconsin
Marquette University
2005 establishments in Wisconsin
Statues in Wisconsin
Sculptures of men in Wisconsin
Jacques Marquette